The Amazonian red-sided opossum (Monodelphis glirina) is a South American opossum species of the family Didelphidae, formerly viewed as part of M. brevicaudata. It is found in Bolivia, Brazil and Peru, where it inhabits the Amazon rainforest. It is omnivorous, nocturnal, and primarily nonarboreal.

References

Opossums
Marsupials of South America
Fauna of the Amazon
Mammals of Brazil
Mammals of Peru
Mammals of Bolivia
Mammals described in 1842